The GUAM Organization for Democracy and Economic Development is a regional organization of four post-Soviet states: Georgia, Ukraine, Azerbaijan, and Moldova.

Conceived in 1997 to harmonize and integrate commercial, diplomatic and democratic relations among its member states, the GUAM treaty charter was signed in 2001 and today covers a population of over 57 million people. Uzbekistan was also a member of GUAM in the 1999–2005 period. In 2003, GUAM became an observer in the UN General Assembly. In 2007, GUAM also established a military peacekeeping force and organized joint military exercises. Such increasingly deepened integration and relationships led to GUAM playing an important role in the region's diplomatic and commercial affairs. 

The official negotiating language of GUAM was Russian, but it was scrapped in favor of English in 2014. In 2017, agreements on a free-trade area were established for the first time.

History

Origins and foundation, Uzbek membership (1997–2005)

Cooperation between Georgia, Ukraine, Azerbaijan, and Moldova started with the "GUAM consultative forum", established on 10 October 1997, in Strasbourg and named after the initial letters of each of those countries.  In 1999, the organisation adopted the name GUUAM due to the membership of Uzbekistan. A summit in Yalta on 6 and 7 June 2001 was accompanied by the signing of GUUAM's charter, which formalized the organization. According to the former Ukrainian President Viktor Yushchenko, the charter set objectives for cooperation, such as promoting democratic values, ensuring stable development, enhancing international and regional security, and stepping up European integration. 

In 2002, Uzbekistan announced that it planned to withdraw from the organization and following this announcement started to ignore GUUAM summits and meetings. In May 2005, shortly after the Andijan massacre, Uzbekistan finally gave official notice of withdrawal from the organization to the Moldovan presidency, thus changing the group's name back to GUAM.

A summit of GUUAM took place in Chișinău, Moldova, on 22 April 2005. The US Department of State special representative for Eurasian conflicts, Steven Mann, and the OSCE Secretary General, Ján Kubiš, participated in the summit. The Russian ambassador in Chișinău criticized the fact that Russia was not invited to attend. Ilham Aliyev, the president of Azerbaijan, said after the summit: "Our organization is emerging as a powerful force, participating in resolving problems in the Caspian—Black Sea region" while the president of Ukraine, Viktor Yushchenko, said that a new page had been written in the history of the organization.

Deepening of relations and integration (2006–2013)
Given the growth of its influence in the region, and the existence of the Russian—led Commonwealth of Independent States (CIS), GUAM was seen in Russia as a way of countering the Russian influence in the area and as part of a strategy backed by the United States. However, GUAM leaders repeatedly and officially dismiss such claims and declare their strong willingness to develop close friendly relations with Russia. Moreover, Azerbaijan, the group's main energy power, has managed to avoid any conflicts with Russia in recent years.

In April 2006, three GUAM nations supported Ukraine's proposal to condemn the Holodomor, the 1930s famine in Ukraine which killed millions of people, as a genocide.

In May 2006, Ukraine and Azerbaijan announced plans to further increase the GUAM member relations by renaming the organization GUAM Organization for Democracy and Economic Development and establishing its headquarters in the Ukrainian capital. The other members said this was a remarkable step and development. The summit participants were also expected to adopt GUAM by—laws, a declaration and a communique. Also in May 2006 the Ukrainian Defense Ministry announced plans to establish GUAM peacekeeping forces. The following year, GUAM nations agreed to form a 500-personnel joint peacekeeping force to battle separatism.

In June 2007, presidents of Lithuania, Poland and Romania joined the leaders of GUAM member states at the GUAM summit in Baku, Azerbaijan. Also participating at the summit were the Vice-President of Bulgaria, the Vice-Speaker of the Estonian parliament, the Minister of Economy of Latvia, and the high—level representatives of the United States, Japan, the Organization for Security and Co-operation in Europe (OSCE), the Organization of the Black Sea Economic Cooperation (BSEC), UNESCO, and heads of diplomatic missions accredited in Azerbaijan.

After Russian invasion and annexation of Crimea (2014–present)
In December 2014, then-Ukrainian Foreign Minister Pavlo Klimkin proposed that GUAM should use English during meetings, instead of Russian, which was also the main language used in official gatherings in the Soviet Union. GUAM representatives agreed.

In March 2017, GUAM officially established agreements on a free-trade area and harmonization of customs procedures among its member states.

In May 2021, three of the four members, Ukraine, Moldova, and Georgia, joined the Association Trio in order to jointly facilitate further European integration.

Members 

 Current
  (1997)
  (1997)
  (1997)
  (1997)

 Former
  (1999–2002)

See also 

 Association Trio
 Black Sea Forum
 Commonwealth of Independent States
 Community of Democratic Choice
 Community for Democracy and Rights of Nations
 Euronest Parliamentary Assembly
 Military of Azerbaijan
 Military of Georgia
 Military of Moldova
 Military of Ukraine
 Politics of Europe
 Post-Soviet states
 Shanghai Cooperation Organisation
 TRACECA

Notes

References
 
 
 GUAM News (subscribers only)
 Baku Today

External links 

 

2001 in international relations
2001 establishments in Asia
2001 establishments in Europe
2001 establishments in Azerbaijan
2001 establishments in Georgia (country)
2001 establishments in Moldova
2001 establishments in Ukraine
Azerbaijan–Georgia (country) relations
Black Sea organizations
European integration
International diplomatic organizations
International organizations based in Asia
International organizations based in Europe
Intergovernmental organizations established by treaty
Foreign relations of Azerbaijan
Foreign relations of Georgia (country)
Foreign relations of Moldova
Foreign relations of Ukraine
Post-Soviet alliances
Organizations established in 2001
United Nations General Assembly observers